, also romanized as Kashō, was a  after Chōji and before Tennin. This period spanned the years from April 1106 through August 1108.

Change of era
 February 6, 1106 : The new era name was created to mark an event or series of events. The previous era ended and the new one commenced in Chōji 3, on the 9th day of the 4th month of 1106.

Events of the Kajō era
 October 3, 1106 (Kajō 1):  Petitions seeking mitigation of "evil influences on the Emperor" were presented at major Shinto shrines.
 August 19, 1107 (Kajō 1, 19th day of the 7th month): In the 21st year of Emperor Horikawa-tennōs reign (堀河天皇21年), the emperor died at the age of 29; and the succession (senso) was received by his only son. Shortly thereafter, Emperor Toba is said to have acceded to the throne (sokui).

Notes

References
 Brown, Delmer M. and Ichirō Ishida, eds. (1979).  Gukanshō: The Future and the Past. Berkeley: University of California Press. ;  OCLC 251325323
 Nussbaum, Louis-Frédéric and Käthe Roth. (2005).  Japan encyclopedia. Cambridge: Harvard University Press. ;  OCLC 58053128
 Titsingh, Isaac. (1834). Nihon Ōdai Ichiran; ou,  Annales des empereurs du Japon.  Paris: Royal Asiatic Society, Oriental Translation Fund of Great Britain and Ireland. OCLC 5850691
 Varley, H. Paul. (1980). A Chronicle of Gods and Sovereigns: Jinnō Shōtōki of Kitabatake Chikafusa. New York: Columbia University Press. ;  OCLC 6042764

External links
 National Diet Library, "The Japanese Calendar" -- historical overview plus illustrative images from library's collection

Japanese eras
12th century in Japan